Austin Owens (November 7, 1988), professionally known as Ayo the Producer, is an American hip hop record producer, songwriter, and audio engineer. He is one half of Ayo N Keyz along with fellow producer Keyz. Ayo the Producer has worked with artists such as Chris Brown, Bryson Tiller, K Michelle, Wiz Khalifa, Diddy, Rick Ross, and Cardi B.

Early life 
Ayo was born on November 7, 1988 in Orlando, Florida. He met KEYZBABY in 2012 producing the single "Let's Talk" by Omarion and Rick Ross which became Ayo N Keyz first song placement.

Discography

Recognition and Awards

References

1988 births
Living people
American audio engineers
American hip hop record producers
American male songwriters
Grammy Award winners